The North Pine Dam is a mass concrete gravity dam with earth-fill embankments on abutments with a gated spillway across the North Pine River that is located in the South East region of Queensland, Australia. The main purpose of the dam is for supply of potable water for the Moreton Bay region and Brisbane's northern suburbs. The impounded reservoir is called Lake Samsonvale.

Location and features
The dam is located north-west of Brisbane, within the Moreton Bay region, at Joyner, near the settlements of Whiteside, and Petrie.

The North Pine Dam was designed by the Department of Local Government, with the Co-ordinator General's Department supervising construction contracts headed by Transfield. The cost of the dam was 20 million, and the dam was opened on 12 August 1976 by the Lord Mayor of Brisbane City Council, Alderman Frank Sleeman.

The  dam wall holds back the  reservoir when at full capacity. Initially managed by the Brisbane City Council and then SunWater, management of the dam was transferred to SEQ Water in July 2008 as part of a water security project in the South East Queensland region, known as the South East Queensland Water Grid. The accompanying water treatment plant is also managed by SEQ Water.

Prior to the initial flooding of the valley, many of the surrounding grazing and dairy farms were compulsorily acquired, and the only evidence of these farms is now the names of roads leading to the lake's shoreline, such as Winn Road and Golds Scrub Lane. Golds Scrub Lane now leads only to the Samsonvale Cemetery; prior to the flooding of the dam, the site was also home to a church and a post office. To allow for the dam's flooding,  of road had to be relocated and rebuilt.

The drought in Australia caused water levels to drop to 14% capacity, the lowest since it was built. The cessation of water supply was meant to protect the dam from potential blue green algae blooms in the coming summer months.

Flood mitigation
The North Pine Dam was designed with little flood mitigation capacity in mind, being designed only for water storage. As such, during flood seasons the location of the dam spillway causes the flooding and closure of Youngs Crossing Road. Flood conditions last affected the dam catchment in October 2010, and prior to that 1991, 1989 and 2000 & 2009. The dam wall is also one of the few in Queensland to be located upstream of a large urban area, and in the event of overtopping or dam failure, Geoscience Australia suggests that the downstream urban population would be flooded within three hours.

Recreational uses
Recreational use of the lake and its surrounding bushland reserve is severely limited, with prohibited recreational activities including swimming, water skiing, diving, mountain biking, horse riding, canoeing and kayaking, camping, and bushwalking. Picnic facilities are available at four locations around the dam, with access prohibited outside of daylight hours.

Fishing
For many years fishing was banned in the dam. Lake Samsonvale has been stocked by Pine Rivers Fish Stocking Association www.prfma.com.au with fresh water fish, including spangled perch, snub-nosed garfish, golden perch, silver perch, eastern freshwater cod, saratoga and Australian bass, with varying levels of success. The dam is also home to the noxious species tilapia which is a fine eating sportfish in its larger sizes but tends to overpopulate and stunt if uncontrolled, as well as a population of Australian red claw crayfish, usually native only to Northern Queensland. Both the tilapia and red claw species are the target of considerable local effort for their capture and complete removal.

Like various other Queensland freshwater fisheries, a stocked impoundment permit is required to fish in North Pine Dam.

Boating
All boating on the lake is prohibited except through two groups. The Lake Samsonvale Water Sports Association and the stocking group Pine Rivers Fish Stocking Association have 300 permits to release each year for non petrol powered craft to members of the public for a small licence fee

See also

List of dams in Queensland

References

1976 establishments in Australia
Dams completed in 1976
Dams in Queensland
Gravity dams
Samsonvale, Lake
Shire of Pine Rivers
South East Queensland